Ansuino da Forlì was an Italian painter of the Quattrocento period. Born and active in Forlì and Padua in the mid-15th century, he was a member of a Forlì painting school and influenced the great Melozzo da Forlì.

He trained with Squarcione and worked with Andrea Mantegna in the Ovetari Chapel for the  church of the Eremitani in Padua.

References

15th-century Italian painters
Italian male painters
Italian Renaissance painters
People from Forlì
Year of death unknown
Year of birth unknown